Andrejs Gražulis (born 21 July 1993) is a professional Latvian basketball player for Dolomiti Energia Trento of the Italian Lega Basket Serie A (LBA).

Early career
Andrejs Gražulis started playing organized basketball at age of 16. In 2009, Gražulis was discovered as a basketball player during open try-outs held by BK Ventspils during time when he was in high-school and his primary sport was athletics. He joined Ventspils youth academy and later started playing for its main team.

Professional career
On July 14, 2017, Gražulis signed with Parma Basket of the VTB United League for the 2017–18 season. He spent the 2019-20 season with Derthona where he averaged 16.8 points and 8.3 rebounds in Serie A2. Gražulis signed with Allianz Trieste on June 19, 2020. He averaged 8.3 points and 5.6 rebounds per game. On July 3, 2021, Gražulis re-signed with the team.

On June 17, 2022, he has signed with Dolomiti Energia Trento of the Italian Lega Basket Serie A (LBA).

International career
In July 2013, Gražulis represented U20 Latvian National Team that won silver in U20 European Championship. Gražulis made key basket at the end of the game to secure Latvia's win over Spain and place in finals.

In the following year he received first call-up to Latvian National Team.

References

External links
FIBA Europe Profile
Latvian National Team Profile

1993 births
Living people
Aquila Basket Trento players
BK Valmiera players
BK Ventspils players
Latvian men's basketball players
Lega Basket Serie A players
Pallacanestro Trieste players
Parma Basket players
People from Koknese
Power forwards (basketball)